The list of ship launches in 1704 includes a chronological list of some ships launched in 1704.


References

1704
Ship launches